Inshū or Inshu may refer to:

 Inshū, another name for Inaba Province.
, also called Onshū.
 Inshū, another name for Oki Province.